Adam Croft is an English writer of crime fiction. He is a self-published author and is an advocate of independent publishing.

Work

Writing 
Croft has written more than twenty books, including the Knight & Culverhouse crime thrillers and Kempston Hardwick mysteries. He has hit the USA Today bestseller list twice, with the Kempston Hardwick box set and his 2015 psychological thriller Her Last Tomorrow. Although he had been writing and self-publishing professionally for five years when Her Last Tomorrow was released, it was this book that brought him international attention. He has also had several plays published with Lazy Bee Scripts.

As an advocate of self-publishing, he has often spoken out about the negative sides of traditional publishing and in 2012 he responded angrily to Sue Grafton's comments that self-publishing was disrespectful and lazy. Grafton later apologised for her comments.

He was awarded an Honorary Doctorate of Arts by the University of Bedfordshire in March 2018 "in recognition of his outstanding services to literature".

In 2020, he announced he was launching a new crime series set in Rutland.

Personal life 
Adam Croft lives in Flitwick, Bedfordshire.

Bibliography 
Knight & Culverhouse
 Too Close for Comfort (2011)
 Guilty as Sin (2011)
 Jack Be Nimble (2015)
 Rough Justice (2015)
 In Too Deep (2016)
 In the Name of the Father (2016)
 With A Vengeance (2017)
 Dead & Buried (2018)
 In Plain Sight (2019)
Rutland crime series

 What Lies Beneath (2020)
 On Borrowed Time (2020)
 In Cold Blood (28 May 2021)
Kiss of Death (2022)

Kempston Hardwick Mysteries
 Exit Stage Left (2011)
 The Westerlea House Mystery (2013)
 Death Under the Sun (2014)
 The Thirteenth Room (2015)
 The Wrong Man (2019)
Psychological thrillers
 Her Last Tomorrow (2015)
 Only the Truth (2017)
 In Her Image (2017)
 Tell Me I'm Wrong (2018)
 The Perfect Lie (2019)
 Closer To You (2020)
Sam Barker

 Absolution (2019)
 Betrayal (2020)

Short Stories
 Gone (2016)
 Love You To Death (2017)
 The Harder They Fall (2017)
Plays
 Sleeping Dogs (2014)
 Curtain Up! (2015)
 Home, Sweet Home (2015)

References

Living people
Year of birth missing (living people)
English crime fiction writers
People from Flitwick